The Orgasmatron Tour was a concert tour by heavy metal band Motörhead in support of their album, Orgasmatron. It would be the final tour with Pete Gill, as he would be fired in 1987 and replaced with Phil "Philthy Animal" Taylor for the remainder of the tour.

Overview 
Originally the band was planning on having a life sized replica of the train from cover of Orgasmatron, akin to the Bomber rig and the Iron Fist prop. In his biography White Line Fever, Lemmy described how it was supposed to work:

During the band North American leg in 1986 Lemmy recalls it "not being our most stellar tour". Megadeth opened for a few dates but were dropped due to frustrations with their manager. During their show in Chalmette, Louisiana the band cut their set short due to the crowd continuously spitting on the band, which resulted in a riot. In 1987, Motörhead appeared in the Peter Richardson film Eat the Rich. As the band was about to film their cameo, however, drummer Pete Gill was fired and Phil "Philthy Animal" Taylor rejoined after having quit in 1984. Gill tried to downplay his firing saying in The Hard Report that his departure was "by mutual agreement. I left for business reasons, not musical or personal. There has been no great rift." Lemmy adds that he knew Taylor, who had been playing with Frankie Miller and ex-Thin Lizzy guitarist Brian "Robbo" Robertson, wanted to come back. Phil would go on to finish the last remaining dates of the tour.

Personnel
Lemmy Kilmister – bass guitar, vocals
Phil "Wizzö" Campbell – guitar
Michael "Würzel" Burston – guitar
Pete Gill – drums (26 March 1986 – 10 February 1987)
Phil "Philthy Animal" Taylor (5 March 1987 – 28 April 1987)

Setlists

1986
"Iron Fist"
"Stay Clean"
"Nothing Up My Sleeve"
"Metropolis"
"Doctor Rock"
"Killed by Death"
"Ace of Spades"
"Steal Your Face"
”Deaf Forever”
"Bite the Bullet"
"Built for Speed"
"No Class"
"Orgasmatron"
"Motorhead"

Encore:
 "Bomber"
"Overkill"

1987
"Iron Fist"
"Stay Clean"
"Nothing Up My Sleeve"
"Metropolis"
"Doctor Rock"
"Deaf Forever”
"Ace of Spades"
"Steal Your Face"
"Ain't My Crime"
"Bite the Bullet"
"Built for Speed"
"No Class"
"Orgasmatron"
"Motorhead"

Encore:
 "Killed by Death"
"Overkill"

Tour dates

References

Sources 
 
 

Motörhead concert tours
1986 concert tours
1987 concert tours